Pusztamonostor is a village in Jász-Nagykun-Szolnok county, in the Northern Great Plain region of central Hungary. Near Pusztamonostor, there is the Jászberény Shortwave Transmitter, the largest shortwave broadcasting station in Hungary.

Geography

External links
 Official site in Hungarian

Pusztamonostor
Jászság